Antonio Rosti (born 23 October 1993) is an Italian football player who plays for Castellazzo Bormida.

Club career
He made his professional debut in the Lega Pro for Vigor Lamezia on 9 November 2014 in a game against Matera.

References

External links
 

1993 births
People from Alessandria
Footballers from Piedmont
Living people
Italian footballers
A.S.D. HSL Derthona players
S.S.D. Città di Brindisi players
U.S. Ancona 1905 players
A.S. Gualdo Casacastalda players
Vigor Lamezia players
S.S. Arezzo players
U.S. Salernitana 1919 players
Serie C players
Serie D players
Association football goalkeepers
Sportspeople from the Province of Alessandria